What Just Happened may refer to:

 What Just Happened (2008 film), an American comedy-drama film directed by Barry Levinson and starring Robert De Niro
 What Just Happened (2018 film), a Nigerian comedy film directed by Charles Uwagbai
 What Just Happened??! with Fred Savage, a 2019 American television talk show parody series starring Fred Savage